This is a list of airlines currently operating in Bermuda.

Current airlines

See also
 Lists of airlines
 List of defunct airlines of North America

Aviation in Bermuda
Airlines
Bermuda
Bermuda